Lampsilis satura, also known as the sandbank pocketbook, is a species of freshwater mussel, an aquatic bivalve mollusk in the family Unionidae, the river mussels. This species is endemic to the United States.

References

Molluscs of the United States
satura
Bivalves described in 1852
Taxonomy articles created by Polbot